This is a list of some notable current and former American copy editors.

American copy editors
 Lois Bryan Adams – editor, Michigan Farmer
 Margaret L. Bailey – editor and proprietor, The Philanthropist; editor, The Youth's Monthly Visitor and The National Era
 Catharine Webb Barber – editor, Madison Visitor and Southern Literary Companion; editor and proprietor, Miss Barber's Weekly
 Melvin L. Barnet –  copy editor, The New York Times
 Josephine Cushman Bateham – editor, ladies department, Ohio Cultivator
 Emma Lee Benedict – editorial staff, New York School Journal; managing editor, Scientific Temperance Journal 
 Tosh Berman
 Theodore M. Bernstein former editor of The New York Times; author of The Careful Writer, Watch Your Language and several other books on grammar and usage
 Anna Braden – editor, Presbyterian Visitor'''
 Florence Anderson Clark – co-editor, The Kentucky People William G. Connolly co-author of The New York Times Manual of Style and Usage; member of the American Copy Editors Society executive board
 Harriet L. Cramer – editor and publisher, The Evening Wisconsin Nannie Webb Curtis editor, Texas White Ribbon, the official organ of the Texas Woman's Christian Temperance Union
 Josephine Donovan
 Benjamin Dreyer – copy chief, Random House
 Mary Fels – editor, The Public: A Journal of Democracy Jessie Forsyth – editor, The Temperance Brotherhood, The Massachusetts Templar, International Good Templar, and The DawnElla M. George – editor, Pennsylvania W.C.T.U. Bulletin Hugh Hefner worked at Fortune magazine as a copy editor before founding Playboy magazine
 Annabel Morris Holvey – editor, The Bulletin (Pennsylvania); assistant editor, The People Corinne Stocker Horton – society editor, The Atlanta Journal-Constitution Liv Mammone — editor of Uma Dwivedi’s poetry collection They Called her Goddess; we Named her Girl,  the speculative fiction series Margins and Murmurations by author and activist, Otter Lieffe, and the literary press  Game Over Books 
 Annie Virginia McCracken  proprietor and editor of The Pine Forest Echo John McIntyre assistant managing editor for the copy desk at The Baltimore Sun; a past president of the American Copy Editors Society; author of the blog You Don't Say of The Baltimore Sun Dorothea Rhodes Lummis Moore – dramatic editor and musical editor, Los Angeles Times Mary Norris (copy editor)
 Patricia T. O'Conner
 Eleanor Gould Packard
 Elizabeth Fry Page – associate editor, American Homes and Taylor-Trotwood Magazine Sarah Maria Clinton Perkins – editor, A True Republic Alice Hobbins Porter – editor, Chicago Inter Ocean Anna Rankin Riggs  founder, editor, Oregon White Ribbon Pam Robinson co-founder and first president of the American Copy Editors Society
 Allan M. Siegal co-author of The New York Times Manual of Style and Usage; retired
 Lura Eugenie Brown Smith – editor, Milwaukee Sunday Telegraph; co-editor and owner, Northwestern Freemason; associate and literary editor, The Masonic Tribune Jennie O. Starkey – journalist, editor, Detroit Free Press Jane Agnes Stewart – associate editor, The Union Signal; editor, Oak and Ivy Leaf and Young Women Susie Forrest Swift – editor, All the World, the international organ of the Salvation Army
 Sarah Katherine Taylor – editor, The Little Christian, All Nations Monthly, and Bible Faith Mission Standard Bill Walsh copy editor for the Washington Post, he also authored three books about the profession of copy editing and ran a website focused upon copy editing titled "The Slot".
 Alice Willard – editor, Times (Loup City, Nebraska); managing editor, Woman's Signal Budget'' (London)

See also

 ACES: The Society for Editing
 Lists of Americans
 Proofreading

References

External links
Report from the 1997 ACES Conference
Executive board of the American Copy Editors Society

American copy editors
Copy editors
Lists of journalists